The Russia women's national water polo team represents Russia in international women's water polo competitions and friendly matches.

History

In the Russian Empire
Water polo in Russia dates back to 1910, when the sport was included into the national water sports programme. The Shuvalov school was opened back then, featuring rules that differed from the international rules. In 1913, the first water polo tournament was played between the Shuvalov school and Moscow, with the first winning 3–2. The new sport progressed in Russia, as all swimming organizations included this sport into their programme. P. Erofeev and A. Shemansky further populized water polo by publishing brochures with rules and hints.

In the Soviet Union
As previously, water polo was predominant in Moscow and Leningrad (formerly known as St. Petersburg). However, this changed when the water polo teams of the Black Sea Fleet, Baltic Fleet and Caspian Flotilla further spread water polo in Russia. In the early history, water polo was popular especially among sailors. The strongest teams were Delfin of Leningrad and the Moscow Life Saving Society and the Yacht-Club. Following the resolution by the organizing bureau of the Central Committee of the Communist Party of the Soviet Union in 1925, physical culture has been greatly propagated in Russia, stimulating water polo as well.

The first championship took place in 1925. Apart from the teams of Leningrad, Moscow and Kyiv, the tournament featured teams from the Caucasus, Crimea, Ural, as well as the aforementioned fleet teams. Three years later, water polo was included in the All-Union Spartakiade (sports festival). The team of Leningrad dominated in Russian water polo until 1933, as the city had winter water pools and so had more training opportunities. In 1946, the USSR Water Polo Cup was introduced. One year later, the Soviet Union was selected into the FINA. The national water polo then debuted at the 1952 Winter Olympics in Helsinki.

Results

Olympic Games

World Championship

FINA World Cup

 1995 – 4th place
 1997 –  Silver medal
 1999 – 7th place
 2002 – 4th place
 2006 –  Bronze medal
 2010 – 4th place
 2014 – 6th place
 2018 –  Silver medal

FINA World League

 2004 – 4th place
 2005 –  Silver medal
 2006 –  Bronze medal
 2007 – eliminated
 2008 –  Gold medal
 2009 – 6th place
 2010 – 4th place
 2011 – 5th place
 2012 – 5th place
 2013 –  Silver medal
 2014 – 7th place
 2015 – 5th place
 2016 – 6th place
 2017 –  Bronze medal
 2018 –  Bronze medal
 2020 –  Bronze medal

European Championship

LEN Europa Cup

Team

Current squad
Roster for the 2020 Summer Olympics.

Past squads

 1999 European Championship –  Bronze medal
Marina Akobia, Natalia Koutouzova, Sofia Konukh, Maria Koroleva, Svetlana Kouzina, Yuliya Petrova, Tatiana Petrova, Galina Rytova, Elena Smurova, Elena Tokoun, Irina Tolkounova and Ekaterina Vassilieva. Head Coach: Sergei Frolov.

 2000 Olympic Games –  Bronze medal
Marina Akobia, Ekaterina Anikeeva, Natalia Koutouzova, Sofia Konukh, Maria Koroleva, Svetlana Kouzina, Yuliya Petrova, Tatiana Petrova, Galina Rytova, Elena Smurova, Elena Tokoun, Irina Tolkounova and Ekaterina Vassilieva. Head Coach: Sergei Frolov.

 2001 European Championship –  Bronze medal
Marina Akobia, Galina Ritova, Valentina Voroncova, Svetlana Kouzina, Veronika Linkova, Olga Kallkova, Maria Yaina, Yekatyerina Szolotko, Anna Klocskova, Irina Tolkunova, Yekaterina Salimova, Anastassia Zoubkova, Tatiana Petrova, Natalia Shepelina and Natalya Kutuzova. Head Coach: Sergei Frolov.

 2003 World Championship –  Bronze medal
 Svetlana Bogdanova, Sofia Konukh, Veronika Linkova, Tatiana Petrova, Yekaterina Salimova, Natalya Shepelina, Ekaterina Shishova, Elena Smurova, Olga Turova, Valentina Voronisova, Maria Yaina, Galina Zlotnikova and Anastassia Zoubkova. Head Coach: Yury Mitianin.

 2006 European Championship –  Gold medal
Olga Fomicheva, Yulia Gaufler, Nadezda Glyzina, Evgeniya Ivanova, Sofia Konukh, Ekaterina Kuzbetsova, Ekaterina Pantyulina, Evgeniya Protsenko, Natalya Ryzhova-Alenicheva, Natalya Shepelina, Elena Smurova, Ekaterina Tankeyeva, Aleksandra Vorobeva, Alena Vylegzhanina and Anastasia Zubkova. Head Coach: Alexander Kleymenov.

 2007 World Championship –  Bronze medal
Olga Fomicheva, Nadezda Glyzina, Sofia Konukh, Maria Kovtunovskaya, Ekaterina Pantyulina, Natalya Ryzhova-Alenicheva, Natalya Shepelina, Elena Smurova, Evgenia Soboleva, Valentina Vorontsova, Alena Vylegzhanina, Ekaterina Zubacheva and Anastasia Zubkova. Head Coach: Alexander Kleymenov.

 2008 FINA Olympic Qualifying Tournament –  Silver medal
Olga Belyaeva, Nadezda Glyzina, Sofia Konukh, Ekaterina Pantyulina, Natalya Shepelina, Ekaterina Prokofyeva, Evgeniya Protsenko, Evgenia Soboleva, Elena Smurova, Anna Timofeyeva, Valentina Vorontsova, Alena Vylegzhanina and Anastasia Zubkova. Head Coach: Alexander Kleymenov.

 2008 European Championship –  Gold medal
Valentina Vorontsova, Natalia Shepelina, Ekaterina Prokofyeva, Sofia Konukh, Alena Vylegzhanina, Nadezda Glyzina, Ekaterina Pantyulina, Evgenia Soboleva, Oleksandra Karpovich, Olga Belyaeva, Elena Smurova, Olga Turova and Evgeniya Protsenko. Head Coach: Alexander Kleymenov.

 2015 European Games –  Gold medal
Maria Bersneva, Anastasia Fedotova, Daria Gerzanich, Evgenia Golovina, Anna Isakova, Polina Kempf, Bella Khamzaeva (c), Elena Kotanchyan, Alena Serzhantova, Svetlana Stepakhina, Veronika Vakhitova, Elizaveta Zaplatina, Aleksandra Zelenkovskaya. Coaches: Andrei Belofastov, Alexander Fedoseev.

Under-20 team
Russia's women have won three titles at the FINA Junior Water Polo World Championships, including back-to-back titles at the 2017 and 2019 events. Its first crown came in 2009 at home in Khanty-Mansiysk, beating the Dutch in the final. 

At the most recent 2021 event, Russia headlined Group D, which also featured Hungary, Brazil and Uzbekistan.

See also
 Russia women's Olympic water polo team records and statistics
 Russia men's national water polo team

References

External links

SportKinef
Gold Russian Waterpolo Girls. Baku 2015

Women's national water polo teams
Women's water polo in Russia